The Splitterring (German compound combining Splitter (splinter or fragment) and Ring (ring)) was a fragmentation sleeve for the M24 and M43 stick grenades, developed by the Heer in 1942.   German stick grenades had only a thin steel casing surrounding the explosive charge, which relied principally on blast for effect; the addition of a Splitterring gave it greatly increased anti-personnel fragmentation ability.

A Splitterring was also developed for the never issued Panzerfaust 150 anti-tank weapon late in World War II. Combined with a time delay detonation of the Panzerfaust 150's projectile, it enabled the weapon to achieve air bursts above troops' positions.

Background
Concussion grenades are best used in enclosed spaces such as buildings or bunkers, which contain the blast for maximum effect; anti-personnel fragmentation grenades are designed to be effective against personnel in the open. The Splitterring was a simple cylindrical steel sleeve, with either a smooth or serrated surface, clipped in place over the head of a stick grenade with three keepers around the base, and secured with a tension ring.  This easy modification allowed a single type of grenade to be manufactured and carried by soldiers, whereas other nations often produced separate types of concussion and anti-personnel grenades.

A similar sleeve was fitted as a standard item to the Soviet RGD-33 Grenade.

Sources

Fragmentation grenades
Hand grenades of Germany
Military equipment introduced from 1940 to 1944